Polynoncus sallei is a species of hide beetle in the subfamily Omorginae found in Ecuador, Peru, and Magadascar, making it the only Polynoncus species to live outside of South America.

References

sallei
Beetles described in 1872
Beetles of South America